Saptapadi  is a 1981 Indian Telugu-language drama film written and directed by K. Viswanath. The film garnered the National Film Award for Best Feature Film on National Integration. The film is not only about the seven steps that one takes to become a part of the institution of marriage and a ritualistic exercise that completes the act of shedding the bachelorhood and entering a more stable state but talks about an individual's journey breaking away from the shackles from the conservatism to finding a path of understanding, encompassing and enlightenment. The film was premiered at the International Film Festival of India, and the AISFM film festival. It was later remade in Hindi as Jaag Utha Insan in 1984, also directed by K Viswanath. The film won four Nandi Awards.

Plot
Saptapadi deals with the transformation of an individual so devoted to (mired in) the concept of rituals, that it takes an act of God (will be discussed shortly) for him to realize the true spirit behind the rituals and true meaning of the prayers. Yajulu is a man of great conviction. According to him rules and customs, that have been passed down generations thus standing the test of the time, are there for a reason and hence are immutable; traditions are trademarks of culture and customs, its signature. He does not mind losing his daughter for his principles.

He is well into his twilight years which give him even more reason to not mend his ways. In his footsteps follows his Gaurinadha (grandchild from his son), gearing up to be head of a priest at the local temple. Yajulu's will prevails over Hema's (grandchild from his daughter) wish and Gauri and Hema end up being married. However, Hema is secretly in love with a flutist, who is not of her caste. The brilliance of Viswanath comes full fore at this point, when on the first night, Gauri witnesses Durga Devi in Hema, and walks out of the room completely shaken up. Gaurinadha, being an ardent devotee of the Devi, realizes that his wife is in love with another man, hence she is like a mother to him, nothing more, nothing less. This act of God triggers Yajulu's thought process to seriously question, for the first time in his life, the validity of his position on matters that involve caste, creed and religion, justifying the steps that Yajulu takes one a time, from the first one in trying to understand Hema's real interests till the last one when he sees her off with her love interest on the boat.

The crux of the whole film is contained in a beautiful conversation that happens between the characters played by Allu Rama Lingaiah and J.V. Somayajulu.

Cast
 J. V. Somayajulu as Yajulu
 Allu Ramalingayya as Raju
 J. V. Ramana Murthy as Avadhani, Yajulu's son
 Dubbing Janaki as Annapurna, Avadhani's wife
 Ravikanth as Gowrinatha Sastry, Yajulu's grandson
 Bhamidipati Sabita as Hema
 Girish Pradhaan as Haribabu
 Jhansi as Katyayani
 Prameela Rani as Karuna
 Sivaparvathi as Raju's daughter
 Sakshi Ranga Rao as Chayanulu

Soundtrack

Awards

|-
| 1981
| K. Viswanath  B. Bucchireddy
| Nargis Dutt Award for Best Feature Film on National Integration
| 
|-
| 1981
| K. Viswanath
| Nandi Award for Best Screenplay Writer
| 
|-
| 1981 
| G. G. Krishna rao
| Nandi Award for Best Editor
| 
|-
| 1981
| Kasthuri
| Nandi Award for Best Cinematographer
| 
|-
| 1981
| S. Janaki
| Nandi Award for Best Female Playback Singer
| 
|-
| 1981
| Bucchireddy
| Filmfare Award for Best Film – Telugu
| 
|-
|}

References

External links
 

1981 films
Indian romantic drama films
1980s Telugu-language films
Films directed by K. Viswanath
Films scored by K. V. Mahadevan
Films about Indian slavery
Films about women in India
Social realism in film
Indian feminist films
Films about Indian weddings
Films about weddings in the United States
Indian nonlinear narrative films
Films about the caste system in India
Films shot in Vijayawada
Telugu films remade in other languages
Best Film on National Integration National Film Award winners
1980s feminist films
1981 romantic drama films